Narmanspor is a Turkish women's ice hockey team in Narman district of Erzurum, Turkey playing in the Turkish Ice Hockey Women's League (TBHBL).

The club's colors are white and black on green. Narmanspor's current president is Hüseyin Yavuz. The team, coached by Huriye Yeliz Yüksel, who is also the captain of the team, play their home matches at Erzurum GSIM Ice Arena.

In February 2013, the club transferred the 23-year-old Canadian player Brıttany Marıe McCabe to strengthen the squad. The team finished the 2013–14 league season in the second rank. In March 2014, ten players of the team were called up to the Turkey women's national ice hockey team's 30 candidates by the Turkish Ice Hockey Federation.

Team roster
As of 2015–16 season.

Legend
G: Goaltender
D: Defenseman
F: Forward
C: Captain

Honours
Turkish Women's League
 Champion (2): 2014–15, 2016–17.
 Runners-up (2): 2013–14, 2015–16.

References

Sport in Erzurum
Turkish Ice Hockey Women's League teams
Ice hockey teams in Turkey